William A. Petit Jr. (born September 24, 1956) is an American politician. A Republican, he represented District 22 (Plainville and formerly part of New Britain) in the Connecticut House of Representatives from 2017 to 2023. A former physician, he was the sole survivor of the 2007 Cheshire home invasion, in which his wife and two daughters were murdered.

Early life and education
Petit was born in Southington and grew up in Plainville, where his father had a general store and was on the school board and the town council as well as being a member of the Republican state central committee. After graduating from Plainville High School, he earned an undergraduate degree from Dartmouth College and a medical degree from the University of Pittsburgh School of Medicine, followed by a fellowship in endocrinology at the Yale University School of Medicine.

Practice as a physician and home invasion
In 1989, Petit entered private practice in Plainville. In 1989, he also became medical director of the Joslin Diabetes Center at New Britain General Hospital, now a campus of The Hospital of Central Connecticut, and from 1994 to 2008 he served as Director of Public Health for Plainville.

On July 23, 2007, Petit's wife, Jennifer, and two daughters were murdered in a home invasion robbery and arson at their house in Cheshire. Mrs. Petit and one of her daughters were raped before their deaths. Despite serious injuries from a baseball bat, Petit escaped and was the only survivor.

Philanthropy and advocacy
In the years following the loss of his family, Petit attended the trials of the two attackers who were later both convicted of murder, and devoted himself to philanthropy. In 2007, he founded the Petit Family Foundation, which supports education, especially of women in science; people affected by chronic illnesses (his wife had multiple sclerosis); and assistance to victims of violence. He also advocated for victims' rights and in defense of the death penalty. 

In 2012, the Democratic-controlled state legislature of Connecticut and Governor Dannel Malloy abolished the death penalty for future crimes. 11 men remained on the state's death row until 2015, when the Connecticut Supreme Court ruled, by a vote of 4-3, in State v. Santiago, that applying the death penalty only for past cases was unconstitutional, thus ending the death penalty in Connecticut. The two attackers were subsequently re-sentenced to life without parole.

Political career
A Republican, in 2014 Petit considered running for Congress in the 5th district against then freshman Democrat Elizabeth Esty, but decided against it. He also declined to run for the seat in 2018.

In the 2016 election, he won election to the Connecticut House of Representatives from the 22nd district, defeating 11-term incumbent Democrat Elizabeth "Betty" Boukus. He defeated Democrat Richard Ireland Jr. for his second term in 2018 and ran unopposed for reelection in 2020.

Petit declined to run for reelection in 2022.

Personal life
Petit's daughters, Hayley and Michaela, were 17 and 11 when they and his wife Jennifer Hawke-Petit were murdered. In 2012, he remarried to Christine Paluf, a photographer whom he met when she volunteered for the Petit Foundation. They have a son, William Petit III.

References 

Living people
1956 births
Republican Party members of the Connecticut House of Representatives
21st-century American politicians
American philanthropists
American physicians
People from Plainville, Connecticut
Dartmouth College alumni
University of Pittsburgh School of Medicine alumni
Yale School of Medicine alumni